The  is an AC electric multiple unit (EMU) train type on order by Kyushu Railway Company (JR Kyushu) in Japan. Two three-car trains were delivered in February 2018 for testing in preparation for full production and entry into revenue service. Revenue service commenced in March 2019. There are currently 7 three-car trains in service.

Formation
The 821 series trains are formed as three-car sets as follows.

History

Details of the trains on order were officially announced by JR Kyushu in January 2018. Two three-car trains were delivered in February 2018 from the Hitachi factory in Kudamatsu, Yamaguchi.

The trains first entered revenue service on 16 March 2019 on the Kagoshima Main Line.

References

External links

 JR Kyushu press release issued on 26 January 2018 

Electric multiple units of Japan
Kyushu Railway Company
Train-related introductions in 2018
Hitachi multiple units
20 kV AC multiple units